Putnam or Puttnam is a surname. Notable people with the surnames include:

Adam Putnam (born 1974), American politician
Ann Putnam, Jr. (1679–1716), an accuser in the Salem witch trials
Ashley Putnam (born 1952), American opera singer
Benjamin Putnam (born 1981), American drag queen and comedian known as BenDeLaCreme
Brenda Putnam (1890–1975), American sculptor
Carleton Putnam (c. 1902–1998), American aviator, activist and author
Charles Flint Putnam (1854–1882), US naval officer, polar explorer
David Putnam (1898–1918), American World War I air ace
David Puttnam (born 1941), British film producer
 Donald Fulton Putnam ( 1969), Canadian geographer, winner of Massey Medal
Douglas Putnam (1838–1918), American military officer
Edson A. Putnam (1832–1917), American politician
Frank W. Putnam (1917–2006), American biologist
Frederic Ward Putnam (1839–1915), American anthropologist, Harvard University
George Putnam (1914–2008), American journalist
George Haven Putnam (1844–1930), American book entrepreneur and publishing-family member
George Palmer Putnam (1814–1872), American book entrepreneur
George P. Putnam (1887–1950), American publisher, author, explorer, and publishing-family and aviation-family member
Harvey Putnam (1793–1855), U.S. Congressman from New York
Herbert Putnam (1861–1955), American library administrator and publishing-family member
Hilary Putnam (1926–2016), American philosopher
Howard Putnam (b. 1937), American travel business manager
Israel Putnam (1718–1790), American general
James Putnam (disambiguation), several people
Mary Corinna Putnam Jacobi (1842–1906), American physician
Michael Putnam (born 1983), American professional golfer
Palmer Cosslett Putnam (1900–1984), American wind power pioneer and author, builder of the Smith–Putnam wind turbine
Phelps Putnam (1894–1948), American poet
Robert D. Putnam (born 1941), American political scientist
Roger Putnam (1892–1972), American politician and industrialist
Rufus Putnam (1738–1824), American soldier
Ruth Putnam (disambiguation), several people
Ruth Anna Putnam (1927–2019), American philosopher
Seth Putnam (1968–2011), American musician
Thomas Putnam (1651–1699), landowner and accuser in Salem, Massachusetts, during the Salem witch trials
Tracy Putnam (1894–1975), medical researcher, co-discoverer of Phenytoin
William Putnam (disambiguation), several people

See also
Putnam family, founded in America in the 17th century
Putnam (disambiguation)
List of places named for Israel Putnam